Pádraig Faulkner (12 March 1918 – 1 June 2012) was an Irish Fianna Fáil politician who served as Ceann Comhairle of Dáil Éireann from 1980 to 1981, Minister for Defence 1979 to 1980, Minister for Posts and Telegraphs and Minister for Tourism and Transport from 1977 to 1979, Minister for Education from 1969 to 1973, Minister for the Gaeltacht and Minister for Lands from 1968 to 1969 and Parliamentary Secretary to the Minister for the Gaeltacht from 1965 to 1968. He served as a Teachta Dála (TD) for the Louth constituency from 1957 to 1987.

Faulkner was born in Dundalk, County Louth, in 1918. He was educated at Dundalk CBS and St Patrick's College of Education in Drumcondra, Dublin, where he qualified as a national school teacher. Faulkner grew up in Dunleer in South Louth, where his father was a strong supporter of Fine Gael, while his mother supported the more Republican and working class Fianna Fáil. He favoured his mother's political outlook, and joined Fianna Fáil. Faulkner unsuccessfully contested the Louth by-election in 1954 but at the 1957 general election, he was elected to Dáil Éireann.

In 1965, Faulkner was appointed Parliamentary Secretary to the Minister for the Gaeltacht by the Taoiseach, Seán Lemass. He was appointed to the Cabinet by the new Taoiseach Jack Lynch in 1968, and served in every Fianna Fáil-led government until 1980. During the Arms Crisis he was a Lynch loyalist. He was one of a number of senior TDs who organised the assembly of TDs and Senators in Dublin Airport to welcome Lynch home from the United States, after the defendants had been found not guilty at the Arms Trial. Nine years later in 1979 one of those defendants, Charles Haughey, was elected Taoiseach. Faulkner was retained in the Cabinet until 1980 when he was elected Ceann Comhairle of Dáil Éireann.

Following the election of a new Ceann Comhairle immediately after the 1981 general election, he retired to the backbenches before retiring from politics at the 1987 general election. In a Dáil career that spanned thirty years, his most notable achievements include the introduction of the legislation to establish two commercial semi-State companies, An Post and Telecom Éireann. Faulkner was subsequently appointed to the Council of State by President Patrick Hillery in 1990.

He died at the age of 94, on 1 June 2012.

References

 

1918 births
2012 deaths
Fianna Fáil TDs
People from Dundalk
Members of the 16th Dáil
Members of the 17th Dáil
Members of the 18th Dáil
Members of the 19th Dáil
Members of the 20th Dáil
Members of the 21st Dáil
Members of the 22nd Dáil
Members of the 23rd Dáil
Members of the 24th Dáil
Local councillors in County Louth
Irish schoolteachers
Alumni of St Patrick's College, Dublin
Presiding officers of Dáil Éireann
Presidential appointees to the Council of State (Ireland)
Ministers for Defence (Ireland)
Ministers for Education (Ireland)
Ministers for Transport (Ireland)
Parliamentary Secretaries of the 18th Dáil